Manfred Frank (born March 22, 1945) is a German philosopher, emeritus professor of philosophy at the University of Tübingen. His work focuses on German idealism, romanticism, and the concepts of subjectivity and self-consciousness.  His 950-page study of German romanticism, Unendliche Annäherung, has been described as "the most comprehensive and thoroughgoing study of early German romanticism" and "surely one of the most important books from the post-War period on the history of German philosophy."   He has also written at length on analytic philosophy and recent French philosophy.

Life

Frank was born in Elberfeld, Germany, and studied philosophy at the University of Heidelberg under teachers such as Hans-Georg Gadamer, Karl Löwith, Ernst Tugendhat, and Dieter Henrich. After teaching at the University of Düsseldorf from 1971 to 1982, and at the University of Geneva from 1982 to 1987, Frank accepted a position at Tübingen in 1987.  He is a specialist in the philosophy of literature.

Selected works

Books
He is the author of a wide range of books published in German, French, and English, including:
 The Philosophical Foundations of Early German Romanticism. Albany, NY: State University of New York Press, 2004. 
 The Subject and the Text: Essays on Literary Theory and Philosophy.  Cambridge, U.K. & New York : Cambridge University Press, 1997. 
What Is Neostructuralism? Minneapolis : University of Minnesota Press, 1989. 
Das Problem "Zeit" in der deutschen Romantik ; Zeitbewusstsein und Bewusstsein von Zeitlichkeit in der frühromantischen Philosophie und in Tiecks Dichtung. Paderborn : Winkler Verlag, 1972, 1990. 
L'ultime raison du sujet. Arles, France : Actes Sud, 1988. 
Einführung in die frühromantische Ästhetik. Vorlesungen Frankfurt a. M.: Suhrkamp (es 1563), 1989
Selbstbewußtsein und Selbsterkenntnis: Essays zur analytischen Philosophie der Subjektivität. Stuttgart: Reclam, 1991
"Unendliche Annäherung". Die Anfänge der philosophischen Frühromantik. Frankfurt a. M.: Suhrkamp (stw 1328), 1997
Auswege aus dem deutschen Idealismus. Frankfurt a. M.: Suhrkamp (stw 1851), 2007
Natura e Spirito. Lezioni sulla filosofia di Schelling., a cura di Emilio Carlo Corriero, Torino, Rosenberg & Sellier, 2010

Articles
"The World as Will and Representation: Deleuze's and Guattari's Critique of Capitalism as Schizo-Analysis and Schizo-Discourse". Telos 57 (Fall 1983). New York: Telos Press.
‘Non-objectal Subjectivity’, Journal of Consciousness Studies 14: 5–6, 152–173, May / June 2007.
"Qu’est-ce qu’un texte littéraire et que signifie sa compréhension?", in Revue Internationale de Philosophie, vol. 41, nº 162/163 (3-4), « Philosophie de la Littérature », 1987, p. 378-397. Partial translation of an article originally published in German. (Read online).

Notes

Further reading
Alessandro Bertinetto "Autocoscienza e soggettività nel pensiero di Manfred Frank"  Torino: Zamorani, 1998.

External links
 Frank's University homepage

1945 births
20th-century essayists
20th-century German male writers
20th-century German philosophers
21st-century essayists
21st-century German male writers
21st-century German philosophers
Academic staff of Heinrich Heine University Düsseldorf
Continental philosophers
Epistemologists
German male essayists
German male non-fiction writers
Historians of philosophy
Idealists
Literary theorists
Living people
Metaphilosophers
Ontologists
Philosophers of art
Philosophers of culture
Philosophers of literature
Philosophers of mind
Academic staff of the University of Tübingen
Academic staff of the University of Geneva